0Y (zero Y) or 0-Y may refer to:
0 (year)
0y, the notation for zero yellow in CMYK

See also
OY (disambiguation)
Y0 (disambiguation)
Year Zero (disambiguation)